The Dai Khitai  are a tribe of Hazara people in Afghanistan.

Origin 
Regardless of their position among the major groupings, the Dai Khitai are often seen as coming together with the Dai Chopan tribe to form the larger Uruzgani Hazara tribe.

See also 
 List of Hazara tribes
 Hazara people
 Dai Chopan

References

Hazara tribes